Thomas Henry Jenkins ( – 1932), also known by the nicknames of "Chic", and "Chick", was a Welsh rugby union, and professional rugby league footballer who played in the 1900s and 1910s.

Background
Chick Jenkins was born in Cwm, Wales.

International honours
Chick Jenkins won caps for Wales (RL) while at Ebbw Vale 1908–1912 7-caps, and was part of the 1910 Great Britain Lions tour of Australia and New Zealand.

References

Notes

External links
!Great Britain Statistics at englandrl.co.uk (statistics currently missing due to not having appeared for both Great Britain, and England)
(archived by web.archive.org) Heritage Numbers For Players 1-250 at walesrugbyleague.co.uk (superseded)
 ĎŔƑ Pastplayers → I at pontypoolrugby.co.uk
 ĎŔƑ Statistics at pontypoolrugby.co.uk
 ĎŔƑ Pastplayers → I at pontypoolrugby.co.uk
 ĎŔƑ Statistics at pontypoolrugby.co.uk
(archived by web.archive.org)  Stats → Past Players → J at hullfc.com
(archived by web.archive.org) Statistics at hullfc.com

Ebbw Vale RLFC players
Great Britain national rugby league team players
Hull F.C. players
Place of death missing
Pontypool RFC players
Rugby league centres
Rugby league fullbacks
Rugby league players from Blaenau Gwent
Rugby union players from Blaenau Gwent
Wales national rugby league team players
Welsh rugby league players
Welsh rugby union players
Year of birth missing
Year of death missing